Muhammad Ibrahim Khan  was a leading politician   of the Khyber-Pakhtunkhwa province of Pakistan.

Life

Coming from the outskirts of Peshawar area known as Khalisa, named after the Sikh invaders, he joined Muhammad Ali Jinnah in the Pakistan movement, and was known by many as "the king maker of the frontier". He was popularly known for his resolve and aura and referred to informally by the name Jhagra Khan. Jhagra Khan was a former Congressite and was largely responsible for gaining support for the Pakistan Muslim League (PML) in the Khyber Pakhtunkhwa province for Abdul Qayyum Khan, the first Chief Minister of the province after independence. 

He was the General Secretary of the PML until he died of throat cancer. He died in England where he was supposed to be treated; his family receiving condolences from many heads of nations including Queen Elizabeth II. 

Governors of Khyber Pakhtunkhwa